Ronnie LeBlanc is a Canadian politician, who was elected to the Nova Scotia House of Assembly in the 2021 Nova Scotia general election. He represents the riding of Clare as a member of the Nova Scotia Liberal Party.

A fisherman by career, LeBlanc served as a municipal councillor in Clare from 2000 to 2021.

Electoral record

References

Year of birth missing (living people)
Living people
Nova Scotia Liberal Party MLAs
Nova Scotia municipal councillors
21st-century Canadian politicians